Warren Spring Laboratory was a UK government environmental science research centre that operated in Stevenage, Hertfordshire from 1958 until its closure in 1994. Described by  New Scientist as "Britain's leading laboratory for environmental research", and by  The Times as "one of Europe's most important environmental research centres", it had an international reputation in areas such as air and water pollution, waste management and recycling, land remediation, alternative fuel research, and chemical engineering. In 1994, after some political controversy, the laboratory was closed and merged with AEA Technology to form the National Environmental Technology Centre (NETCEN).

Key research 

Warren Spring Laboratory was organized in six separate divisions: 
 Air Pollution
 Pollution Abatement
 Materials Recovery 
 Biological Treatment 
 Marine Pollution and Bulk Materials
 Chemical Analysis

Broadly, its mission was to monitor and reduce environmental pollution and land contamination, to optimize the use of materials, and to recover useful materials, such as precious metals, from waste.

History 

The laboratory was originally conceived as a replacement for the Department of Scientific and Industrial Research Fuel Research Station in Greenwich. However, it was deliberately given a much less specific name, based on the area in Stevenage where it was built, to reflect a wider brief than simply researching fuel. It was planned by the Fuel Research Station's chief development officer, David Penny, who became the project's consulting engineer. According to  The Herald , "despite a rather vague and constantly changing specification, the Warren Spring laboratory at Stevenage was completed on schedule and met all the complex technical requirements". After transferring from DSIR to the Ministry of Technology in 1965, it was run by the Department of Trade and Industry (and its various successors) until 1994.

Closure 

In the early 1990s, Michael Heseltine, the UK government's President of the Board of Trade, announced that Warren Spring Laboratory would move to new premises in nearby Welwyn Garden City. Later, however, following a report from the PA Consulting Group, Heseltine scrapped the plan and announced that the laboratory would merge with the Atomic Energy Authority (AEA) and transfer to Harwell, Oxfordshire instead. This prompted considerable public opposition – and many of the Warren Spring staff simply refused to move, including most of its air pollution scientists.

There was political opposition too. In May 1993, an Early Day Motion supported by 89 mostly opposition (Labour) MPs noted "with concern reports that the President of the Board of Trade now intends to go back on the agreement reached in 1992 to relocate Warren Spring Laboratory and instead to close it with the loss of 150 jobs and scientific expertise built up over many years; and calls on the President of the Board of Trade to save Warren Spring Laboratory from closure". Later, opposition MP Michael Meacher highlighted what he saw as conflicts of interest and a lack of competitive tendering, arguing that the plan was essentially motivated by the government's wider privatisation agenda, while Chris Smith MP called the plan "merely a fattening-up exercise for privatising AEA, which was not a particularly sellable proposition on its own". In response, for the government, David Davis MP countered that the merger would "over the next five years, save the taxpayer perhaps £32 million", though the eventual saving was just £8 million.

The site of Warren Spring Laboratory, at Gunnels Wood Road, Stevenage, was sold to Glaxo, the pharmaceuticals company, for £25 million, and subsequently became a research and development laboratory.

References

Laboratories in the United Kingdom
Research institutes in Hertfordshire
Air pollution in the United Kingdom
Science and technology in the United Kingdom